Ludovico Buti (c. 1560 - after 1611) was an Italian painter, active mostly in Florence.

Belonging to the late-Mannerist period, he worked along with more famous figures as Alessandro Allori, Bernardino Poccetti or Santi di Tito on large projects, including the decoration of certain ceilings of the Uffizi and the Grand Cloister of Santa Maria Novella. In 1589, the duke Ferdinando I commissioned the decoration of the Map Room and the Stanzino delle Matematiche, following a design by Stefano Buonsignori. There is a fresco by Buti on the Annunciation at the Basilica of Our Lady of Humility in Pistoia, as well as the cathedral at Fiesole.

References

1560s births
17th-century deaths
16th-century Italian painters
Italian male painters
17th-century Italian painters
Painters from Florence
Italian Mannerist painters